This is a chronological list of the most notable people from Leeuwarden, who were either born and raised there or were long-term residents. For a more extensive, alphabetical list see People from Leeuwarden.

See also List of mayors of Leeuwarden

Born in Leeuwarden

15th century
 Wijerd Jelckama ( 1490–1523), military commander
 Hendrik Niehoff (1495– 1561), pipe organ maker

16th century
 Obbe Philips ( 1500–1568), anabaptist
 Dirk Philips (1504–1568), anabaptist and theologian
 Hans Vredeman de Vries (1527– 1607), architect, painter, and engineer
 Johannes Basius ( 1540–1596), lawyer
 Dominicus Arumaeus (1579–1637), jurist
 Pieter de Valck (1584–1624), painter
 Wybrand de Geest (1592–1661), painter
 Matthijs Harings (1593–1667), painter
 Jeronimus Cornelisz (1598–1629), apothecary

17th century
 Margaretha de Heer (1603–1665), painter
 Douwe Juwes de Dowe (1608–1662), painter
 Maerten Boelema de Stomme (1611–1644), painter
 Saskia van Uylenburg (1612–1642), wife of the painter Rembrandt van Rijn
 Abraham Lambertsz van den Tempel (1622–1672), painter
 Wilhelmus à Brakel (1635–1711), minister
 Wigerus Vitringa (1657–1725), painter
 Campegius Vitringa (1659–1722), theologian
 Siwart Haverkamp (1684–1742), classicist

18th century
 Matthijs Accama (1702–1783), painter
 Jacques-Georges Chauffepié (1702–1786), biographer, preacher
 Douwe Sirtema van Grovestins (1710–1778), courtier and politician
 Willem van Haren (1710–1768), poet
 Princess Amalia of Nassau-Dietz (1710–1777), princess
 William IV, Prince of Orange (1711–1751), stadtholder
 Lodewijk Caspar Valckenaer (1715–1785), classical scholar
 Rienk Jelgerhuis (1729–1806), painter 
 Joachim van Plettenberg (1739–1793), colonial governor
 Princess Carolina of Orange-Nassau (1743–1787), regent
 Theodorus van Kooten (1749–1813), poet and politician
 Johannes Jelgerhuis (1770–1836), painter and actor
 Sybren Klazes Sybrandi (1772–1854), mennonite minister
 Eelke Jelles Eelkema (1788–1839), painter
 Wilhelmina van Idsinga (1788–1819), painter
 Jacobus Schroeder van der Kolk (1797–1862), anatomist and physiologist

19th century
 Charles William Meredith van de Velde (1818–1898), lieutenant-at-sea and painter
 Julius Vitringa Coulon (1824–1878), politician
 Christoffel Bisschop (1828-1904), painter
 Willem Frederik Reinier Suringar (1832–1898), botanist
 Piet Paaltjens (1835–1894), minister and romantic author
 Lawrence Alma-Tadema (1836–1912), knighted painter
 Sierk Coolsma (1840–1926), missionary and writer
 George Arnold Escher (1843–1939), civil engineer
 Klaas Plantinga (1846–1922), distiller
 Richard Bisschop (1849–1926), painter
 Cornelis Adriaan Lobry van Troostenburg de Bruyn (1857–1904), chemist
 Pieter Jelles Troelstra (1860–1930), politician
 Dirk van Erp (1860–1933), artisan and metalsmith
 Johannes Henricus Gerardus Jansen (1868–1936), archbishop
 Max Dwinger (1870–1939), fencer
 Theo Molkenboer (1871–1920), painter
 Theodoor Hendrik van de Velde (1873–1937), gynaecologist
 Folkert Posthuma (1874–1943), politician
 Mata Hari (1876–1917), exotic dancer and courtesan, possible double agent
 Gerhard Westermann (1880–1971), artist
 Richard Hageman (1881–1966), conductor, pianist, composer, and actor
 Max Blokzijl (1884-1946), singer and journalist
 Hendrik Wouda (1885–1946), architect
 Jacob Baart de la Faille (1886–1959), art critic
 Arie Bijvoet (1891–1976), footballer
 Bert Sas (1892–1948), military attaché
 Ate Faber (1894–1962), fencer
 Jeanne Bieruma Oosting (1898–1994), sculptor, engraver and painter
 Sijtse Jansma (1898–1977), tug of war competitor
 Jan Jacob Slauerhoff (1898–1936), poet and novelist
 M. C. Escher (1898–1972), graphic artist

20th century

1900s 
 Christine Buisman (1900–1936), phytopathologist
 Koos Sinninghe Damsté (1902–1995), lawyer
 Pieter Oosterhoff (1904–1978), astronomer
 Havank (1904–1964), writer, journalist, and translator
 Piet Zanstra (1905–2003), architect
 Roeffie Vermeulen (1906–1963), sailor
 Jan Graafland (born 1909), footballer
 Petrus Wijtse Winkel (1909–2012), colonial administrator

1910s 
 Albert Winsemius (1910–1996), economist
 Bernard Slicher van Bath (1910–2004), historian
 Bert Bakker (1912–1969), writer
 Nina Baanders-Kessler (1915–2002), sculptor 
 Haije Kramer (1917–2004), chess player

1920s 
 Folkert de Roos (1920–2000), economist
 Ted Meines (1921–2016), army general and activist
 Ruurd Dirk Hoogland (1922–1994), botanist and explorer
 Jan de Vries (1924–2012), soldier
 Jitse van der Veen (1928–1976), swimmer
 Jaap Boersma (1929–2012), politician
 Wim Cohen (1923–2000), mathematician

1930s 
 Eva and Abraham Beem (1932/1934–1944), young Jewish Holocaust victims
 Jan Hettema (1933–2016), cyclist
 Jan D. Achenbach (born 1935), engineer
 Sieta Posthumus (born 1936), swimmer
 Nikolai van der Heyde (born 1936), film director and screenwriter
 Cor Boonstra (born 1938), chief executive
 Cornelis Dirk Andriesse (born 1939), physicist

1940s 
 Johan Bleeker (born 1942), space technology scientist
 Sytse Douma (born 1942), organizational theorist
 Cisca Dresselhuys (born 1943), journalist and magazine editor
 Femme Gaastra (born 1945), historian
 Hans Monderman (1945–2008), traffic engineer
 L. Bouke van der Meer (born 1945), archaeologist
 Meindert Fennema (born 1946), political scientist
 Piet Hoekstra (born 1947), cyclist
 Theo de Jong (born 1947), footballer and football manager
 Rudy Koopmans (born 1948), boxer
 Tom Pitstra (born 1949), politician
 Oeki Hoekema (born 1949), footballer

1950s 
 Peter den Oudsten (born 1951), mayor
 Harm Wiersma (born 1953), draughts player and politician
 Margreeth Smilde (born 1954), politician
 Jan Hogendijk (born 1955),  mathematician and historian
 Henk van der Zwan (born 1956), diplomat
 Koos Formsma (born 1957), businessman
 Piet Wildschut (born 1957), footballer
 Piter Wilkens (born 1959), musician

1960s 
 Hendrik Tolman (born 1961), civil engineer
 Foeke Booy (born 1962), footballer and football manager
 Annejet van der Zijl (born 1962), writer
 Aukje de Vries (born 1964), politician
 Jan Veenhof (born 1969), footballer

1970s 
 Tjitske Reidinga (born 1972), actress
 Richard Schuil (born 1973), beach volleyball player
 Jarich Bakker (born 1974), cyclist
 Peter van der Vlag (born 1977), footballer

1980s 
 Rune Massing (born 1980), badminton player
 Harm Zeinstra (born 1989), footballer

1990s 
 Sander Arends (born 1991), tennis player
 Sanne Wevers (born 1991), gymnast
 Lieke Wevers (born 1991), gymnast
 Mark Diemers (born 1993), footballer
 Itzhak de Laat (born 1994), short track speed skater

 
Leeuwarden